The 1883 Inangahua by-election was a by-election held on 14 May 1883 during the 8th New Zealand Parliament in the West Coast electorate of .

The by-election was caused by the resignation of the incumbent MP Thomas S. Weston. The by-election was won by Edward Shaw.

He was opposed by Edward Wakefield, who opposed the Government. Wakefield got large majorities at Brunnerton and Black's Point.

Results
The following table gives the election result:

Notes

Inangahua 1883
1883 elections in New Zealand
May 1883 events
Buller District
Politics of the West Coast, New Zealand